NURP may refer to:
 National Undersea Research Program
 Nationwide Urban Runoff Program